CEISAL (in Spanish Consejo Europeo de Investigaciones sobre América Latina) is a network of the main institutes and specialised centres in Latin American studies, and national associations of social research on Latin America in Europe. It consists of 51 members representing 19 European countries. It is a  plural and critical space for reflection from the different fields in Social Sciences in order to broaden the knowledge of the social, cultural, economic and political realities.

CEISAL was founded in 1971 in Westphalia. At that time it was an initiative that tried to bring closer relations between Western and Eastern Europe. Its main objective was to promote academic freedom and the exchange of thought that would contribute to the development of studies on Latin America in Europe. 24 research and teaching institutions from 8 western countries participated in its founding together with other institutes in Poland, Hungary and Czechoslovakia.

CEISAL holds annual assemblies. On the occasion of the celebration of the VIII Centenary of the University of Salamanca, it was celebrated in that historic city in 2016, and the General Assembly elected a new Directive Committee.

Members

Germany 
 Asociación Alemana de Investigación sobre América Latina
 German Institute of Global and Area Studies, Institute of Latin America Studies
 Grupo de Investigación Literaturas y Culturas en América Latina
 Instituto Ibero-Americano

Austria 
 Österreichisches Lateinamerika-Institut
 Belgium
 Grupo de investigaciones interdisciplinarias sobre América Latina
 Instituto Interuniversitario para las Relaciones entre Europa, América Latina y el Caribe

Spain 
 Instituto de Estudios Latinoamericanos
 Instituto de Iberoamérica
 Instituto de Iberoamérica y el Mediterráneo
 Línea de Estudios Americanos: Población, ciudadanía y política (Instituto de Historia)

Finland
 Department of Political and Economic Studies
 Department of World Cultures

France 
 Centre de recherche et de documentation des Amériques
 Institut des Amériques
 Institut des hautes études de l'Amérique latine
 Maison Universitaire Franco-Mexicaine

Hungary
 Centro Iberoamericano
 Hispanisztika Tanszek

Italy
 Associazione di Studi Sociali Latinoamericani
 Centro de Estudios, Formación e Información de América Latina
 Centro di Studi Giuridici Latinoamericani
 Centro Studi per l’America Latina

Norway
 Red Noruega de Investigación sobre América Latina / Norwegian Latin America Research Network

Netherlands
 Centro de Estudios y Documentación Latinoamericanos

Poland 
 Centro de Estudios Latinoamericanos de la Universidad de Varsovia (Center for Latin American Studies University of Warsaw, Centrum Studiów Latynoamerykańskich Uniwerystetu Warszawskiego)

Portugal
 Centro de Investigação e Estudos de Sociologia
 Instituto de Ciências Sociais

Czech Republic 
 Centro de Estudios Ibero-Americanos

Romania 
 Departamento de Relaciones Internacionales e Integración Europea, Escuela Nacional de Estudios Políticos y Administrativos

Russia 
 Asociación de Estudios sobre el Mundo Iberoamericano
 Centro de Estudios Iberoamericanos
 Instituto de Latinoamérica de la Academia de Ciencias de Rusia
 People's Friendship University of Russia

Sweden 
 Latinamerikainstitutet, Stockholm
 School of Global Studies

Switzerland 
 Sociedad Suiza de Americanistas

Publications 
 The European Americanist yearbook (Anuario Americanista Europeo) 2003-2014.
 European American Bookstore, publications of 2018.
 European virtual library (online documentation available on the internet from congresses or research activities).
 European scientific publications on Latin America.

Related Links 
 Web: https://rediceisal.hypotheses.org/

References 

Latin America
Latin American studies